Rainer Moormann (born 1950) is a German chemist and nuclear whistleblower. He grew up in Osnabrück. After finishing highschool he studied physical chemistry in Braunschweig and received a doctor's degree with Raman spectroscopic and theoretical investigations on hydrogen bonds in liquids.

Since 1976 he had been working at the Forschungszentrum Jülich, doing research on safety problems with pebble bed reactors (especially with the AVR reactor), fusion power and spallation neutron sources.

Papers 
In 2008 Moormann published a critical paper on the safety of pebble bed reactors, which raised attention among specialists in the field, and managed to distribute it via the media, facing considerable opposition.

In 2020, Moormann co-authored a paper that argued in favor of keeping the by then six German nuclear power plants running in order to reduce CO2 emissions.

Whistleblower award 
For doing this despite the occupational disadvantages he had to accept as a consequence, Moormann was awarded the whistleblower award of the Federation of German Scientists (VDW) and of the German section of the International Association of Lawyers against Nuclear Arms (IALANA).

See also
 List of nuclear whistleblowers

References

External links 
  PBR safety revisited by Rainer Moormann, Nuclear Engineering International, 1 April 2009

1950 births
German whistleblowers
German physical chemists
20th-century German chemists
Nuclear safety and security
Living people
People associated with nuclear power
Technical University of Braunschweig alumni
Scientists from Osnabrück